Xylota subfasciata , (Loew, 1866), the  Large-spotted Forest Fly , is an uncommon species of syrphid fly observed widely across North America. Syrphid flies are also known as Hover Flies or Flower Flies because the adults are frequently found hovering around flowers from which they feed on nectar and pollen. The larvae of this genus live under bark in sap runs.

Distribution
Canada, United States. GBIF species page with map

References

Eristalinae
Insects described in 1866
Diptera of North America
Hoverflies of North America
Taxa named by Hermann Loew